Devamatha CMI Public School is a co-educational private run Carmelites of Mary Immaculate (C.M.I.) school situated in Thrissur city of Kerala, India. The school is affiliated to the Central Board of Secondary Education, Delhi.

Its principal is Fr.Sunny Punneliparambil CMI and the head of the school is Fr. Davis Panackal CMI.And the Vice- Principal of the School is Fr. Sinto Nangini CMI.

Notable alumni
 Aparna Balamurali, Indian Film Actress

References

Schools in Thrissur